Rupert Harrison CBE (born 1 November 1978) is a British economist and a portfolio manager at BlackRock. He was from 2006 to 2015 the Chief of Staff to George Osborne, the British Chancellor of the Exchequer, and Chair of the Council of Economic Advisers in the UK Treasury.

Early life and education
Born in São Paulo, Harrison is the youngest son of a bank manager and a French teacher. He won a scholarship to Eton College (where he was head boy).

He then went to Magdalen College, Oxford University where he initially studied Physics, but then switched to a Bachelor of Arts degree in Philosophy, Politics and Economics, achieving first-class honours. One of his tutors at Oxford was Stewart Wood, who went on to become an adviser to both Gordon Brown and Ed Miliband, and the two apparently remained friends.

In 2007 he obtained a PhD degree in Economics from University College London entitled, Innovation and technology adoption and his academic research was published in the American Economic Review, the Economic Journal and the Review of Economics and Statistics amongst others.

Career
From 2002, Harrison worked at the Institute for Fiscal Studies as Senior Research Economist.

From 2006-2010 he was Chief Economic Advisor to the then Leader of the Opposition David Cameron and Shadow Chancellor George Osborne. From 2010-2015 he was Chief of Staff to UK Chancellor of the Exchequer, George Osborne, and Chair of the UK’s Council of Economic Advisors.

In August 2015 Harrison joined the investment firm BlackRock where he is a Portfolio Manager and Chief Macro Strategist for Multi-Asset Strategies.

Harrison has written opinion pieces for the Financial Times and appears regularly as a commentator on TV and radio.

Harrison was hired as an economic advisor to the Chancellor Jeremy Hunt in 2022.

Views on Brexit
Harrison believes Brexit damages the UK economy.  He wrote, "Q2 growth of 0.3% is not the end of the world, and I'm less gloomy than many on the outlook. But the rest of Europe is booming and we're not".

Recognition
In 2014 Harrison was said to be one of the most powerful people in the UK and to be the main reason why Osborne could be a "part time" Chancellor.

In March 2014, he was the subject of the BBC Radio 4 Profile programme.

Harrison was appointed a Commander of the Order of the British Empire (CBE) in the 2015 Dissolution Honours Lists on 27 August 2015.

Personal life
In his first year at Oxford he was in a band called Psychid with three other students.

In 2004, he married Jo Orpin, a Magdalen contemporary who has worked as a divorce lawyer and family therapist.

Since January 2017 he has been Chair of The Fore, a charity dedicated to funding small charities and social enterprises.

References

External links

Rupert Harrison on Financial Times

1978 births
Living people
People educated at Eton College
Alumni of University College London
Alumni of Magdalen College, Oxford
British special advisers
Commanders of the Order of the British Empire